The 2020 Four Nationals Figure Skating Championships were held from 13 to 14 December 2019 in Ostrava, Czech Republic. It served as the national championships for the Czech Republic, Hungary, Poland, and Slovakia. The three highest-placing skaters from each country formed their national podiums, after the competition results were split. Medals were awarded in men's singles, ladies' singles, pair skating, and ice dance on the senior, junior, and advanced novice levels. The results were among the criteria used by each national federation to determine international assignments.

Medals summary

Senior

Junior

Advanced novice

Senior results

Men

Ladies

Pairs
Two separate pairs events were held, an international and a domestic Czech edition, as Elizaveta Zhuk (formerly of Russia) has not been released to compete internationally for the Czech Republic.

International

Domestic

Ice dance

Junior results

Pairs

Ice dance

Advanced novice results

Pairs

References

External links
 2020 Four National Championships results

Four National Figure Skating
International figure skating competitions hosted by the Czech Republic
Four National Figure Skating Championships
Four National Figure Skating Championships
Four National Figure Skating Championships
Four National Figure Skating Championships
Four National Figure Skating Championships
Czech Figure Skating Championships
Hungarian Figure Skating Championships
Polish Figure Skating Championships
Slovak Figure Skating Championships